Shattuck House, also known as Longshore House, is a historic home located at Cazenovia in Madison County, New York.  It was built in 1928 and is an asymmetrically massed, -story frame residence built in a combination of the American Craftsman and Colonial Revival styles.  It was built as a summer home for Frank M. Shattuck, a Syracuse restaurateur.

It was added to the National Register of Historic Places in 1991.

References

Houses on the National Register of Historic Places in New York (state)
Colonial Revival architecture in New York (state)
Houses completed in 1928
Houses in Madison County, New York
National Register of Historic Places in Cazenovia, New York